Thiha Sithu is a Burmese professional football player who plays as a goalkeeper for Shan United FC and Myanmar National Football Team. During his career, he played for Ministry of Commerce, Ayeyawaddy United and Yadanarbon. Within his 11 years of professional club career life, he contributed his all clubs to win nine champions along with five 1st runner ups. Sithu also set the Myanmar National League clean sheet record by not conceding a single goal for 14 matches in 2017. and he was also winner of 2014 Myanmar National League Best Player award.

Sithu started his international debut for U-14 Myanmar Youth National Team in 2000 and he represented Myanmar Youth National Team U-14, U-17, U-20, U23 and Myanmar National Team from 2000 to 2018. Therefore, he was considered one of the long time starting goalkeepers in Myanmar.

Honors

Club 
Ayeyawaddy United FC

 Myanmar National League: 2010 1st Runner up
 Myanmar National League: 2011 1st Runner up
  MFF Charity Cup: 2012 Champion
  MFF Digicel Cup: 2012 Champion

Yadanabon FC

  Myanmar National League: 2014 Champion
 Myanmar National League: 2015 1st Runner up

Shan United FC

  Myanmar National League: 2017 Champion
  General Aung San Shield: 2017 Champion
 Myanmar National League: 2018 1st Runner up
 MFF Charity Cup: 2019 Champion
 Myanmar National League: 2019 Champion
General Aung San Shield: 2019 1st Runner up
 MFF Charity Cup: 2020 Champion
 Myanmar National League: 2020 Champion

Individual

 Myanmar National League: 2011 2nd Best Player Award
 Myanmar National League: 2012 2nd Best Player Award
Myanmar National League: 2014 Best Player Award
Myanmar National League: 2017 2nd Best Player Award

International

  AFF U-20 Youth Championship: 2005 Champion
 U23 SEA Games: 2011 Bronze Medal
 Hassanal Bolkiah Trophy: 2007 1st Runner up
 Philippine Peace Cup: 2014 Champion

Early life
Sithu was born in Ayeyarwaddy Region and attended Integrated Training School for Sports and Education in 1997 for playing Gymnastics sports. In 1999, he changed to football and started playing as a goalkeeper. From 2004, he joined Ministry of Commerce Football Club.

Club career

Ayeyawady United
After Myanmar Football Federation started Myanmar National League in 2009, Sithu joined Delta United FC to start his professional career as the captain. He played for the team the AFC Challenge Cup 2010. He was invited to join by Yangon United FC in 2010 but he rejected and decided to continue playing for Ayeyawady United FC which makes him to be a favorite player of Ayeyawady United FC Fans. He is always found to be very enthusiastic and hardworking whether he is playing in his club or in his National Team. Together with Ayeyawaddy United, he was able to achieve two champions, three 1st runner up prizes with several international appearances in the region.

Yadanarbon
In 2013, he transferred from Ayeyawady United FC to Yadanarbon FC. He played as the captain and contributed the club to win the Champion of Myanmar National League in 2014 and 1st Runner up in 2015.

Shan United

2020: League champion and retirement
In the beginning of the 2016 transfer window, Thiha Sithu moved to Shan United as the captain again. Sithu helped the club win six champions so far along with two 1st runner up prizes within 4 years as well as Myanmar National League Undefeated Record in 2019. He played for the team the AFC Champions League in 2018 and 2019. He also set the Myanmar National League clean sheet record by not conceding a single goal for 14 matches in 2017. In Jan 2021, Thiha Sithu retired and work as Club Manager at Shan United.

International career
With U-14 Myanmar Youth National Team, Sithu started his international debut in 2000. After that, he represented Myanmar Youth National Team U-17 and U-20 in 2005, U-23 from 2009 to 2011 and Myanmar National Football Team from 2010 to 2018. During all of his career with Myanmar, he achieved two Champions for AFF U-20 Youth Championship in 2005, Philippine Peace Cup in 2014, also 1st Runner up for Hassanal Bolkiah Trophy in 2007 and Bronze Medal for U23 SEA Games in 2011. Therefore, he was considered as one of the long time starting goalkeeper in Myanmar.

Outside Football 
Aside from his professional player-life, Sithu works on sports education and knowledge experiences sharing to youths with a vision of how sports could impact on the society and next generation in Myanmar. He participated in the events such as ONE Championship ONE:NXT Panel Night, Bar Camp for Youth as not only a motivational speaker but also a professional player. He is also the founder of K1 Football Trainer Center in order to teach football techniques, share experiences and encourage the young generation to be a professional player.

With the outbreak of 2021 Myanmar protests against the earlier coup, he, alongside teammates Kyaw Zin Htet and Maung Maung Lwin, joined the protest movement condemning the military's actions.

References

1987 births
Living people
Sportspeople from Yangon
Burmese footballers
Ayeyawady United F.C. players
Yadanarbon F.C. players
Shan United F.C. players
Myanmar international footballers
Association football goalkeepers
Southeast Asian Games bronze medalists for Myanmar
Southeast Asian Games medalists in football
Competitors at the 2011 Southeast Asian Games